Evarts Worcester Farr (October 10, 1840 – November 30, 1880) was a U.S. Representative from New Hampshire.

Early life
Born in Littleton, New Hampshire, Farr attended the common schools and Dartmouth College.

On May 19, 1861 he married Ellen Frances Burpee Farr with whom he had three children.

American Civil War service
During the Civil War, he entered the Union Army as First Lieutenant of Company G, 2nd New Hampshire Volunteer Regiment, and served as Major in the Eleventh Regiment, New Hampshire Volunteer Infantry.

Postwar career
Following the war, he studied law, was admitted to the bar in 1867 and commenced practice in Littleton, New Hampshire. He served as assistant assessor of internal revenue, 1865–1869, and as assessor of internal revenue 1869–1873. He was solicitor for Grafton County, 1873–1879, and was a member of the Executive Council of New Hampshire in 1876.

Congressional service
Farr was elected as a Republican to the Forty-sixth and Forty-seventh Congresses.  Farr served from March 4, 1879, until his death.  Farr did not serve in the Forty-seventh Congress because he died before it convened.

Death and burial

Farr died in Littleton, New Hampshire on November 30, 1880. He was interred in Glenwood Cemetery.

See also
List of United States Congress members who died in office (1790–1899)

References

External links
 

1840 births
1880 deaths
Republican Party members of the New Hampshire House of Representatives
Dartmouth College alumni
Members of the Executive Council of New Hampshire
Union Army officers
People of New Hampshire in the American Civil War
Republican Party members of the United States House of Representatives from New Hampshire
19th-century American politicians
People from Littleton, New Hampshire
American amputees